Iwogumoa is a genus of Asian funnel weavers first described by Kyukichi Kishida in 1955.

Species
 it contains twenty species:

Iwogumoa acco (Nishikawa, 1987) – Japan
Iwogumoa dalianensis Zhang, Zhu & Wang, 2017 – China
Iwogumoa dicranata (Wang, Yin, Peng & Xie, 1990) – China
Iwogumoa ensifer (Wang & Ono, 1998) – Taiwan
Iwogumoa filamentacea (Tang, Yin & Zhang, 2002) – China
Iwogumoa illustrata (Wang, Yin, Peng & Xie, 1990) – China
Iwogumoa insidiosa (L. Koch, 1878) – Russia (Far East), Korea, Japan
Iwogumoa interuna (Nishikawa, 1977) – Russia (Far East), Korea, Japan
Iwogumoa longa (Wang, Tso & Wu, 2001) – Taiwan
Iwogumoa montivaga (Wang & Ono, 1998) – Taiwan
Iwogumoa nagasakiensis Okumura, 2007 – Japan
Iwogumoa pengi (Ovtchinnikov, 1999) – China
Iwogumoa plancyi (Simon, 1880) – China, Japan
Iwogumoa songminjae (Paik & Yaginuma, 1969) – China, Korea
Iwogumoa taoyuandong (Bao & Yin, 2004) – China
Iwogumoa tengchihensis (Wang & Ono, 1998) – Taiwan
Iwogumoa xieae Liu & Li, 2008 – China
Iwogumoa xinhuiensis (Chen, 1984) – China, Taiwan
Iwogumoa yaeyamensis (Shimojana, 1982) – Japan
Iwogumoa yushanensis (Wang & Ono, 1998) – Taiwan

References

External links

Agelenidae
Araneomorphae genera
Spiders of Asia
Taxa named by Kyukichi Kishida